Peachester is a rural town and locality in the Sunshine Coast Region, Queensland, Australia. In the  the locality of Peachester had a population of 1,357 people.

Geography
Peachester is in the Sunshine Coast hinterland. The D'Aguliar Range commences in the north-west of the locality. Kilcoy–Beerwah Road runs through from west to east.

History 
Peachester was named when the town was surveyed in 1888 by William Embury Hill. The name refers to a peach tree which was growing at the crossing of the Stanley River.

A public hall was built at the town in 1889.

Peachester Provisional School opened on 19 April 1892 in the public hall. Due to low student numbers it closed in 1893 but reopened in 1894. On 2 May 1910 it became Peachester State School.

Early industries included dairying, timber felling for Grigor's sawmill.

On Wednesday 20 June 1906 the Venerable H. F. Le Fanu, Archdeacon of Toowoomba performed a stump capping ceremony for the new Anglican church. St Andrew's Anglican church was dedicated on 1 January 1908 by Archdeacon Le Fanu. The church was destroyed on New Year's Day 1 June 1963 by Tropical Cyclone Annie and was not rebuilt.

Peachester Post Office opened by 1918 (a receiving office had been open from 1895) and closed in 1974.

Between the 1930s and 1950s, Peachester was known as the home of Inigo Jones, the long range weather forecaster.

A fruit case factory for fruit growers operated in the 1920s and post World War II years.

At the 2006 census, Peachester had a population of 452.

In the 2011 census, Peachester had a population of 1,259 people.

In the  the locality of Peachester had a population of 1,357 people.

Heritage listings 
Peachester has a number of heritage-listed sites, including:
Peachester Road: Peachester Public Dip

Education 
Peachester State School is a government primary (Prep-6) school for boys and girls at 966 Peachester Road. In 2018, the school had an enrolment of 85 students with 11 teachers (6 full-time equivalent) and 9 non-teaching staff (4 full-time equivalent).

There is no secondary school in Peachester. The nearest secondary schools are Beerwah State High School in neighbouring Beerwah to the east and Maleny State High School in Maleny to the north-west.

Amenities 
The Sunshine Coast Regional Council operates a mobile library service which visits near the Community Hall.

The Peachester branch of the Queensland Country Women's Association meets at Peachester Hall at 963 Peachester Road.

See also
Blackall Range road network

References

Further reading 
  – available online

External links

 
 

Towns in Queensland
Suburbs of the Sunshine Coast Region
Localities in Queensland